Galbreath Creek is a stream in the U.S. state of Missouri.

Galbreath Creek has the name of an early citizen.

See also
List of rivers of Missouri

References

Rivers of Monroe County, Missouri
Rivers of Randolph County, Missouri
Rivers of Missouri